Green Falls, also known as Johnston's Tavern, Turner's Store, Wright's Corner (Fork), and Dolly Wright's Corner, is a historic home located at Bowling Green, Caroline County, Virginia. It is believed to have been built about 1710 and dating to the Colonial period.  The frame dwelling consists of a two-story, three bay, single pile, central block flanked by one-story wings. It is considered by some historians to be the earliest surviving 18th century frame dwelling in Caroline County. The building housed a tavern in the 18th century, a store in the mid-19th century, and a post office from 1831 to 1859. It features massive brick exterior end chimneys.  Also on the property is a contributing 18th century meat house, late-19th century carriage house, and early-20th century barn.

It was listed on the National Register of Historic Places in 1997.

References

Houses on the National Register of Historic Places in Virginia
Colonial architecture in Virginia
Houses completed in 1710
Houses in Caroline County, Virginia
National Register of Historic Places in Caroline County, Virginia
1710 establishments in Virginia